"Coming Down" is a song by American heavy metal band Five Finger Death Punch. The song was released as the fourth single from their third album, American Capitalist, and their thirteenth single overall. On the week of September 1, the song ranked first on the Billboard Hot Mainstream Rock Tracks chart (their first-ever number one single) and fourteenth on the Billboard Rock Songs chart. The music video premiered on Vevo on June 12, 2012. The song won a 2012 RadioContraband Rock Radio Award for Song of the Year.

Premise
This video was created by Five Finger Death Punch in an effort to prevent suicide among youth.

Music video
The video, directed by Nick Peterson, begins with clips of a young woman (played by Samantha Gill) in a bathroom placing an envelope, a pill bottle and a make-up brush on the counter. Meanwhile, a young man (played by Leland Montgomery) walks out to a kitchen with a revolver in hand where an older man and woman (presumably his parents) are seated having breakfast together. The young man cocks the hammer, then puts the revolver barrel to his head and (presumably) pulls the trigger to commit suicide as his parents try to stop him. After a single gunshot is heard, the song begins playing.

The young woman is shown vomiting on her mirror, implying she attempted suicide by overdosing on pills. The video then flashes back to the events that caused the two young people to attempt suicide. The man argues with his parents and is physically bullied by a gang, causing suicidal signs such as giving away possessions while the woman is sexually abused, cyberbullied and self-harms as a result.

At the end of the video, the two young adults survive the suicide attempts and thank their parents and friends.

Personnel
 Zoltan Bathory – rhythm guitar
 Jason Hook – lead guitar, backing vocals
 Ivan Moody – lead vocals
 Chris Kael – bass guitar, backing vocals
 Jeremy Spencer – drums

Charts

Weekly charts

Year-end charts

References

External links
 
 Official music video

Five Finger Death Punch songs
2012 singles
Songs about suicide
2011 songs
Song recordings produced by Kevin Churko
Songs written by Kevin Churko
Songs written by Zoltan Bathory
Songs written by Ivan Moody (vocalist)
Songs written by Jason Hook
Songs written by Jeremy Spencer (drummer)
Songs about bullying